Stückelberg is a mountain in the Taunus range. It is located in the Taunus Nature Park in Hesse, Germany.

Mountains of Hesse
Mountains and hills of the Taunus